Tolu Akinyemi, also referred to as Poetolu is a Nigerian writer and poet. His work is notable for its relatable insights and humorous take on everyday human experiences.

Biography and education 
Tolu Akinyemi was born in Akure, Ondo State, Nigeria. His parents worked in the state government's civil service. He attended in the same city, Oyemekun Grammar School, where he was first an assistant senior prefect and later became the senior prefect. He then studied Architecture and Design at the Federal University of Technology Akure, earning a Bachelor of Technology degree in Architecture in 2008. In 2011 he obtained a Master of Science degree in Built Environment Studies from the University of Greenwich. He currently lives in London, England.

Writing  
Tolu Akinyemi is the author of four collections of poetry. His first collection Your Father Walks Like A Crab published in 2013, was described by Lola Shoneyin as "a witty debut".
In 2017 and 2018, he was named one of '100 most influential Nigerian writers under 40'. In 2017, he won the Nigerian Writers' Award (Poetry writer of the year) for his poetry collection I Laugh at These Skinny Girls. His works have been featured in advertisements, documentaries, and in cultural and literary publications such as the Association of Nigerian Authors anthologies, Forward Poetry's Great British Write-off Anthology, and Black History Month magazine. In 2017 he obtained the Arts Council England's, "exceptional talent endorsement" as a creative writer. This was a part of the British Home Office's 'exceptional talent visa' programme to attract to the United Kingdom, exceptionally talented individuals in fields such as the arts and sciences.

Akinyemi's writing has also been described as 'poetry for people who hate poetry.

 Other works 

In 2016 he started writing the online 'Halima Series', an illustrated and humorous social commentary on popular culture and everyday experiences from the point of view of the fictional character called Halima. In 2022,Tolu appears in a cameo role as 'Shawn', on the Africa Magic show My Flatmates' (Episode 133).

Bibliography 
Her Head Was A Spider's Nest, 2021 
Funny Men Cannot Be Trusted. Heart of Words UK, 2017 
I laugh at These Skinny Girls. Heart of Words UK, 2015, 
Your Father Walks Like A Crab. Strange Ideas UK, 2013

References

External links 

Living people
Nigerian writers
Alumni of the University of Greenwich
Nigerian male poets
Yoruba poets
20th-century Nigerian poets
Nigerian male novelists
20th-century Nigerian novelists
Nigerian male short story writers
Nigerian short story writers
Academic staff of the Federal University of Technology Akure
21st-century Nigerian poets
Nigerian poets
Year of birth missing (living people)